Calico Rock School District  is a school district based in Calico Rock, Izard County, Arkansas, United States.

It includes Calico Rock, and Wideman.

On July 1, 1993 Tri-County School District was disestablished with territory given to multiple districts, including Calico Rock.

Schools 
 Calico Rock Elementary School, serving kindergarten through grade 6.
 Calico Rock High School, serving grades 7 through 12.

References

Further reading
These include maps of predecessor districts:
 (Download)

External links
 

Education in Izard County, Arkansas
School districts in Arkansas